Viatcheslav Mikhailovich Kharlamov (Вячеслав Михайлович Харламов, born 28 January 1950,  Leningrad) is a Russian-French mathematician specializing in algebraic geometry and differential topology.

Kharlamov studied from 1967 to 1972 at Leningrad State University, where he received his Russian candidate degree (Ph.D.) in 1975 under Vladimir Abramovich Rokhlin with thesis Inequalities and congruences for Euler characteristics of certain real algebraic varieties (Russian). From 1968, he taught at the Specialized Physico-Mathematical Boarding School No. 45 of Leningrad University (in addition to research at the university) and from 1976, he was a professor at the university in Syktyvkar. From 1979 to 1991 he was a professor at the College of Electrical Engineering in Leningrad. In 1985 he received his Russian doctorate (higher doctoral degree) with thesis Nonsingular surfaces of degree four in the real three-dimensional projective space (Russian). He has been a professor at the University of Strasbourg since 1991, where he is a permanent member of the team at the Institut de Recherche Mathématique Avancée, UMRI 7501, CNRS.

From 1972 he succeeded in solving a part of the Hilbert's sixteenth problem, concerning the number of components and the topology of non-singular fourth-order algebraic surfaces in three dimensions. In 1976, he completed his research on this.

In 1977 he was awarded the prize of the Moscow Mathematical Society. In 1978 he was an Invited Speaker of the ICM in Helsinki.

He has French citizenship. His doctoral students include Jean-Yves Welschinger and Thomas Fiedler.

Selected publications
 with Alexander Degtyarev and Ilya Itenberg: Real Enriques Surfaces, Springer Verlag, 2000
 Variétés de Fano réelles, d'après C. Viterbo , Bourbaki Séminaire 872, 1999/2000
 with S. Yu. Orevkov and E. I. Shustin: "Singularity which has no M-smoothing" in The Arnoldfest: Proceedings of a Conference in Honour of V.I. Arnold for his Sixtieth Birthday. Vol. 24. American Mathematical Soc., 1999.
 with O. Ya. Viro, O. A. Ivanov, and N. Yu. Netsvetaev: Elementary Topology: Problem Textbook, American Mathematical Society, 2008 
 as editor with A. Korchagin, G. Polotovskii, and O. Viro: Topology of Real Algebraic Varieties and Related Topics, American Mathematical Society, 1996

References

External links
 mathnet.ru

Saint Petersburg State University alumni
Academic staff of the University of Strasbourg
20th-century Russian mathematicians
21st-century Russian mathematicians
20th-century French mathematicians
21st-century French mathematicians
1950 births
Living people